Zhang Lixin is a Paralympian athlete from China competing mainly in category T54 sprint events.

He competed in the 2008 Summer Paralympics in Beijing, China.  There he won a gold medal in the men's 200 metres - T54 event, a gold medal in the men's 400 metres - T54 event, a gold medal in the men's 4 x 100 metre relay - T53-54 event and a gold medal in the men's 4 x 400 metre relay - T53-54 event. Among his teammates were Cui Yanfeng, Zhang Ji, Zong Kai, and Li Huzhao.

External links
 

Paralympic athletes of China
Athletes (track and field) at the 2008 Summer Paralympics
Paralympic gold medalists for China
Chinese male sprinters
Year of birth missing (living people)
Living people
Medalists at the 2008 Summer Paralympics
Medalists at the 2012 Summer Paralympics
Athletes (track and field) at the 2012 Summer Paralympics
Chinese male wheelchair racers
Paralympic medalists in athletics (track and field)